Politick! Magazine was a quarterly British political magazine. The magazine was aimed at young people 18-35 and was independent of any political party. The magazine was launched in November 2008 and was available in WHSmith, Borders and independent newsagents.

The first two issues of the magazine featured politicians and activists from all the major parties including David Blunkett, Lembit Öpik, Polly Toynbee, Charles Kennedy, Peter Tatchell, Michael Howard, Malcolm Rifkind, Lynne Featherstone, David Bull and Kate Hudson. The magazine also featured non-Government organisations such as WWF Oxfam, Amnesty International and Christian Aid and gave information on how to get involved in political activism at all levels. It was closed in 2010.

References

External links
Politick! Magazine

2008 establishments in the United Kingdom
2010 disestablishments in the United Kingdom
Quarterly magazines published in the United Kingdom
Defunct political magazines published in the United Kingdom
Magazines established in 2008
Magazines disestablished in 2010